José Miguel Morales Martínez (born 26 December 1976) is a Spanish former professional footballer who played as a goalkeeper.

Club career
Born in Barcelona, Catalonia, Morales spent his entire senior career in his region of birth. His professional input consisted of 101 Segunda División matches for Terrassa FC over three seasons, his debut in the competition taking place on 31 August 2002 when he replaced field player Juan Carlos early into a 1–1 home draw against Albacete Balompié after Fernando Maestro was sent off.

In Segunda División B, other than Terrassa, Morales also represented UE Sant Andreu and CF Badalona, retiring well past his 40s. On 29 May 2020, when he only needed one more game to become the most veteran player to appear in that league, it was announced that he would be released by the latter club the following month.

International career
Morales won five caps for the Catalonia regional team in six years.

References

External links

Stats at Trayectorias de Fútbol 

1976 births
Living people
Spanish footballers
Footballers from Barcelona
Association football goalkeepers
Segunda División players
Segunda División B players
Tercera División players
UDA Gramenet footballers
CF Damm players
FC Santboià players
CE Mataró players
Terrassa FC footballers
UE Sant Andreu footballers
CF Badalona players
Catalonia international footballers